Melica paulsenii is a species of grass endemic to Chile where it grows along the coastal cordillera at  above sea level.

Description
The leaf-sheaths are tubular and are closed on one end with its surface being glabrous. The surface is scabrous and have glabrous margins. The main branches of the panicle are appressed and are scabrous with the same goes for panicle axis.

The pedicels are curved, filiform, pubescent, scabrous, and hairy above. Besides the pedicels, the spikelets have 2 fertile florets which are diminished at the apex. Both the upper and lower glumes are keelless, membranous, have asperulous surfaces and acute apexes.

The fruits have caryopsis with additional pericarp and have linear hilum.

Ecology
Melica paulsenii blooms from September to December in provinces from Coquimbo to Santiago.

References

paulsenii
Endemic flora of Chile
Flora of South America